Phungia trotommoides is a species of beetle in the genus Phungia of the family Mordellidae. It was described in 1962.

Subspecies
Phungia trotommoides seraptiiformis Franciscolo, 1962
Phungia trotommoides trotommoides Franciscolo, 1962

References

Mordellidae
Beetles described in 1962